Angela Nikodinov (born May 9, 1980), is a Bulgarian-American former figure skater. She was the 2000 Four Continents champion and won four medals on the Grand Prix series, including gold at the 2004 Skate America

Personal life 
Born in Spartanburg, South Carolina, Angela Nikodinov moved with her family to southern California when she was a child. She was raised in San Pedro, Los Angeles, California. She is the daughter of Bulgarian immigrants and speaks Bulgarian fluently.

Nikodinov and Bulgarian figure skater Ivan Dinev were married in July 2008. Their daughter, Audriana, was born in May 2012.

Career

Competitive 
Nikodinov began skating at about the age of five. She trained in Lake Arrowhead, California.

Nikodinov won the bronze medal at the 1999 U.S. Championships. She was sent to the 1999 Four Continents Championships, where she won bronze, and the 1999 World Championships, finishing 12th in her debut.

Nikodinov trained in Detroit during the 1999-2000 season. She finished 4th at the 2000 U.S. Championships and won gold at the 2000 Four Continents. Originally an alternate for the 2000 Worlds, she received the assignment after Sasha Cohen finished 6th at Junior Worlds and thus failed to meet the requirement for an age loophole. Nikodinov finished 9th at the event.

Nikodinov moved back to California in fall 2000 due to homesickness. She withdrew from the 2001 Goodwill Games due to blurred vision in her left eye caused by viral conjunctivitis. Her coach, Elena Tcherkasskaia, with whom she was very close, died of pancreatic cancer in November 2001. Nikodinov won bronze at the 2001 U.S. Championships and silver at the 2001 Four Continents. She placed 5th in her third appearance at the World Championships.

Nikodinov missed the entire 2002-03 season. She dislocated her shoulder in February 2002 and again in September, and then had a virus which sapped her strength. She withdrew from the U.S. Championships after the short program. She had shoulder surgery in February 2003 and was off the ice for seven months. After missing two Grand Prix seasons, Nikodinov returned to win the 2004 Skate America.

While in Portland, Oregon, for the 2005 U.S. National Championships, she and her family were involved in a car accident that killed her mother. Nikodinov did not return to competition following the accident. During her career, her coaches included John Nicks, Peter Oppegard, Frank Carroll, Elena Tcherkasskaia, Richard Callaghan. Choreographers, Anastasiya Sharenkova, Lori Nichol, Nikolai Morozov.

Post-competitive 
Nikodinov coached Bulgarian figure skater Ivan Dinev in the 2005-06 season. As of 2014, she is the skating director at the Skating Edge in Harbor City, California and coaches alongside Dinev. She occasionally skates in shows and was a guest skater on the Stars on Ice tour. The pairs team of Bianca Butler / Joseph Jacobsen and Tenile Victorsen are among her and Dinev's former students that have qualified for the U.S. Figure Skating Championships at the senior level. In spring 2016, they became the coaches of Kaitlyn Nguyen, who won the 2017 U.S. junior ladies' title.

Programs

Results 
GP: Grand Prix

References

External links

Navigation 

1980 births
American female single skaters
American figure skating coaches
Living people
American people of Bulgarian descent
Figure skaters from Los Angeles
Four Continents Figure Skating Championships medalists
Female sports coaches
Sportspeople from Spartanburg, South Carolina
Competitors at the 1998 Goodwill Games
21st-century American women